Alfred Rieck (5 August 1914 – 14 August 2000) was a German rower who competed in the 1936 Summer Olympics, winning the bronze medal as a crew member of the German boat in the men's eight competition.

References

External links
 
 

1914 births
2000 deaths
Olympic rowers of Germany
Rowers at the 1936 Summer Olympics
Olympic bronze medalists for Germany
Olympic medalists in rowing
German male rowers
Medalists at the 1936 Summer Olympics